The Umpire School District or Umpire Public Schools was a school district headquartered in Umpire, Arkansas.

It operated Umpire Public School, divided into Umpire Elementary School and Umpire High School.

On July 1, 2004, the district was consolidated into the Wickes School District. On July 1, 2010, that district consolidated into the Cossatot River School District.

References

External links
 
 

Defunct school districts in Arkansas
2004 disestablishments in Arkansas
School districts disestablished in 2004
Education in Howard County, Arkansas